Saints Acheolus (or Acheul) and Acius were early Christian martyrs in Gaul. They are associated with Amiens, where Acheolus's name was given to an ancient church, later an abbey.

Butler's account

The martyrologist Alban Butler wrote in his The lives of the fathers, martyrs, and other principal saints (1821),

Miscellaneous

Acheolus and Achius are honored on 1 May.
The emblem of Acheolus is an instrument resembling a wimble.
According to E. Cobham Brewer in A Dictionary of Miracles: Imitative, Realistic, and Dogmatic (1884), 
The saint's name survives in the Abbey of Saint-Acheul in the Saint-Acheul district of Amiens, and in the commune of Saint-Acheul to the north of Amiens,

Notes

Citations

Sources

  
 

Gallo-Roman saints
290 deaths
3rd-century Christian martyrs